The Nikon DX format is an alternative name used by Nikon corporation for APS-C image sensor format being approximately 24x16 mm. The format was created by Nikon for its digital SLR cameras, many of which are equipped with DX-sized sensors. DX format is very similar in size to sensors from Pentax, Sony and other camera manufacturers. All are referred to as APS-C, including the Canon cameras with a slightly smaller sensor.

Nikon has produced 23 lenses for the DX format, from macro to telephoto lenses. 35mm format lenses can also be used with DX format cameras, with additional advantages: less vignetting, less distortion and often better border sharpness. Disadvantages of 35mm lenses include generally higher weight and incompatible features such as autofocus with some lower-end DX cameras. Nikon has also produced digital SLRs that feature the larger Nikon FX format sensor that is the size of the 135 film format.

In 2013, Nikon introduced a high-end compact camera with a DX-sized sensor, the Nikon Coolpix A, featuring an 18.5 mm lens.

Implications 

The  smaller diagonal size of the DX format amounts to a  narrower angle of view than would be achieved with the 135 film format (35 mm film or FX format), using a lens of the same focal length. Strictly in angle-of-view terms, the effect is equivalent to increasing focal length by 50% on a 135 film camera, and so is often described as a 1.5x focal length multiplier.

This effect can be advantageous for telephoto and macro photography as it produces a tighter crop without the need to increase actual focal length. However it becomes disadvantageous for wide-angle photography as a wide-angle lens for 135 film effectively becomes a normal lens for the DX format (e.g. 28 mm x 1.5 = 42 mm 135 film equiv.). This has led to the increased development of the DX format-specific lenses for the Nikon F-mount. Since these lenses do not need to cover the 135 film area, they are smaller and lighter than their 135 format counterparts of equal angle-of-view. The production of DX-specific lenses has also enabled the production of affordable wide-angle lenses for the format (e.g., 12 mm), whereas costly ultra-wide-angle lenses from the 135 format were formerly required.

When DX format lenses are used on 135 format cameras, vignetting often occurs, as the image circle does not cover the entire area of the 135 format.

Real sensor size 

Nikon uses DX format sensors of slightly different sizes, although all of them are classified as APS-C (crop factor more than 1.3 and less than 1.7):

* Coolpix A is a fixed-lens, compact camera.

Lenses

Lenses for Nikon DX format 
 10.5mm 2.8G ED AF DX Fisheye
 35mm 1.8G AF-S DX
 40mm 2.8G DX Micro-Nikkor
 10-24mm 3.5-4.5G ED AF-S DX
 12-24mm 4G ED-IF AF-S DX
 16-85mm 3.5-5.6G ED-IF AF-S DX
 17-55mm 2.8G ED-IF AF-S DX
 18-55mm 3.5-5.6G ED AF-S DX
 18-55mm 3.5-5.6G ED AF-S II DX
 18-55mm f/3.5-5.6G AF-P DX
18-70mm 3.5-4.5G ED-IF AF-S DX
 18-135mm 3.5-5.6G ED-IF AF-S DX
 55-200mm 4-5.6G ED AF-S DX
55-300mm 4.5-5.6G ED AF-S DX
 70-300mm 4.5-6.3G ED AF-P DX

Current Vibration Reduction (VR) lenses in DX format
 AF-P DX NIKKOR 10-20mm 4.5-5.6G VR
 AF-S DX NIKKOR 16-80mm 2.8-4E ED VR
 AF-S DX NIKKOR 16-85mm 3.5-5.6G ED VR
 AF-S DX NIKKOR 18-55mm 3.5-5.6G VR
 AF-S DX NIKKOR 18-55mm 3.5-5.6G VR II
 AF-P DX NIKKOR 18-55mm 3.5-5.6G VR
 AF-S DX NIKKOR 18-140mm 3.5-5.6G ED VR
 AF-S DX NIKKOR 18-105mm 3.5-5.6G ED VR
 AF-S DX NIKKOR 18-200mm 3.5-5.6G ED VR II
 AF-S DX NIKKOR 18-300mm 3.5-5.6G ED VR
 AF-S DX NIKKOR 18-300mm 3.5-6.3G ED VR
AF-S DX NIKKOR 55-200mm f/4-5.6G ED-IF VR
AF-S DX NIKKOR 55-200mm 4-5.6G ED VR II
 AF-S DX NIKKOR 55-300mm 4-5.6G ED VR
 AF-S DX NIKKOR 55-300mm 4.5-5.6G ED VR
 AF-P DX NIKKOR 70-300mm 4.5-6.3G ED VR
 AF-P DX NIKKOR 70-300mm 4.5-5.6E ED VR
 AF-S DX Micro NIKKOR 85mm 3.5G ED VR

See also
Image sensor format
APS-C
Full-frame
Nikon F-mount
List of Nikon F-mount lenses with integrated autofocus motors
Nikon F-mount teleconverter

References

D